Louisa Walter (born 2 December 1978) is a German field hockey player. She was born in Düsseldorf. She won a gold medal at the 2004 Summer Olympics in Athens.

References

External links
 

1978 births
Living people
Sportspeople from Düsseldorf
German female field hockey players
Female field hockey goalkeepers
Olympic field hockey players of Germany
Field hockey players at the 2004 Summer Olympics
Olympic gold medalists for Germany
Olympic medalists in field hockey
Medalists at the 2004 Summer Olympics
21st-century German women